Madhuca brochidodroma is a plant in the family Sapotaceae. The specific epithet brochidodroma means "loop-veined", referring to the leaves.

Description
The bark is reddish brown. Inflorescences bear up to six cream-coloured flowers.

Distribution and habitat
Madhuca brochidodroma is native to Sumatra and Borneo. Its habitat is peat swamp forest.

Conservation
Madhuca brochidodroma has been assessed as endangered on the IUCN Red List. The species is threatened by logging and conversion of land for palm oil plantations.

References

brochidodroma
Trees of Sumatra
Trees of Borneo
Plants described in 1991